An old photo of Arthur Maury (1844-1907), one of original stamp dealers and a renowned philatelic writer

Arthur Maury (Paris, 31 July 1844 – 1 December 1907) was a philatelist who was one of the "Fathers of Philately" entered on the Roll of Distinguished Philatelists in 1921.

References

1844 births
1907 deaths
French philatelists
Businesspeople from Paris
Fathers of philately